Surenavan is a village in the Ararat Municipality of the Ararat Province of Armenia. The village was renamed in 1946 in honor of Suren Spandaryan, a revolutionary.

References

External links 

World Gazetteer: Armenia – World-Gazetteer.com

Populated places in Ararat Province